Michaela Moťovská is a former Slovak football defender, who last played for Slovan Liberec in the Czech Women's First League.

She was a member of the Slovakia national team. She made her debut for the national team on 7 August 2015 in a match against United Arab Emirates.

References

External links
 
 
 
 Michaela Motovska - Slovak Defender 2015 on YouTube

1997 births
Living people
Slovak women's footballers
Expatriate women's footballers in the Czech Republic
Slovak expatriate footballers
Sportspeople from Šaľa
Women's association football defenders
Slovak expatriate sportspeople in the Czech Republic
AC Sparta Praha (women) players
Slovakia women's international footballers
Czech Women's First League players
FC Slovan Liberec players